The 2020 Porsche Mobil 1 Supercup was the 28th Porsche Supercup season. It began on 5 July at the Red Bull Ring and ended on 6 September at the Autodromo Nazionale di Monza, after eight scheduled races, all of which were support events for the 2020 Formula One season.

Teams and drivers

Race calendar and results
The revised calendar was announced on 3 June 2020.

Championship standings

Drivers' Championship

Rookie Championship

Pro-Am Championship

Teams' Championship

References

External links
 

Porsche Supercup seasons
Porsche Supercup